The Actors Studio Drama School at Pace University is a three-year graduate program in the theater arts. It has been located at Pace University in New York since 2006 and grants Master of Fine Arts degrees in acting, directing, and playwriting. James Lipton served as Dean Emeritus. The program is sanctioned by the Actors Studio, though graduation from the school does not guarantee membership in the Actors Studio.

History 
The Actors Studio Drama School was established by the Actors Studio in 1994. From 1994 to 2005, the school was a graduate division of The New School. In 2005, the Actors Studio and The New School declined to renew their contract, and the Actors Studio soon thereafter signed a 10-year contract with Pace University, where the Actors Studio Drama School became a graduate program of the Dyson College of Arts and Sciences. Andreas Manolikakis, chair of the Actors Studio Drama School at Pace, said at the time that he had "no regrets" about the departure from The New School and saw it as "a necessary step for the protection of the philosophy of the original curriculum that was designed by the leaders of the Actors Studio."

The curriculum of the Actors Studio Drama School is highly collaborative, with students from all three concentrations working closely together. All students study acting, based heavily on the work of Constantin Stanislavski. Filming of Inside the Actors Studio serves as a master class for the students a few times a semester. Students also sit in on closed-door sessions at the Actors Studio in New York.

All graduating students hold the status of working finalist at the Actors Studio itself, during which they may attend weekly sessions and audition for Studio membership, bypassing the usual preliminary audition. All directing and playwriting graduates are invited, for at least one year, to be part of the Playwrights and Directors Workshop of the Actors Studio, a unit created for the continuation of the training of directing and playwriting graduates.

Current faculty

Acting
 Susan Aston (Director of Acting)
 Jacqueline Knapp
 Cathy Haase
 Jacqueline Jacobus
 Michael Billingsley (Movement)
 Kate Billingsley (Movement and Playwrights/Directors Unit)
 Yokko Usami (Movement)
 Jim Elliott (Classics)
 Corinna May (Voice and Speech)
 Craig Bacon (Voice and Speech)
 Robert Serrell (Voice and Speech)
 Matthew Dudley (General American Speech)

Directing
 Brian Rhinehart
 Jim Fagan
 Andreas Manolikakis (Former Chair)
 Morgan Jenness (Design)
 Shawn Lewis (Design)

Playwriting
 Sheri Wilner (Director of Playwriting and Co-Chair)
 Clay McLeod Chapman (Screenwriting)
 Julia Rae Maldonado

Notable alumni

1994–2005
From 1994 to 2005, the Actors Studio Drama School was a graduate division of the New School.
 Nadège August
 Austin Basis
 Shelagh Carter
 Bradley Cooper
 Eisa Davis
 Richard Kuranda
 Carey Lovelace
 Matthew Paul Olmos
 Jeremy Kareken
 Irene Sankoff
 Aurin Squire
 Chris Stack
 Lloyd Suh
 Jason Williams (actor)

2006–present
 Bekah Brunstetter
 Jordan Cooper
 Xanthe Elbrick

References

External links 

Pace University
Drama schools in the United States
Performing arts education in New York City
Universities and colleges in Manhattan
Universities and colleges in New York City
Educational institutions established in 2006
University subdivisions in New York (state)
Actors Studio
2006 establishments in New York City